III: The World Tour is the third concert tour by American folk rock band The Lumineers, in support of their third studio album, III (2019). The tour began in Gulf Shores on May 19, 2019, and concluded prematurely on March 11, 2020 in Milwaukee due to the COVID-19 pandemic.

Background
On April 2, 2019, the band first announced they would release their third studio album on September 13, 2019. During the week of the announcement, they announced their first single, "Gloria", and announced European tour dates. Prior to the April announcements, the band had already planned festival performances and special shows leading up to the album release. On August 1, 2019, the band announced North American tour dates. On September 17, 2019, due to phenomenal demand, additional North American dates were announced, prompting second shows in Brooklyn, Rosemont, and Toronto, and newly announced cities. On January 22, 2020, more North American dates were announced for later in the year, including their first stadium show in their hometown of Denver at Coors Field. On March 12, 2020, the band originally postponed the last two shows of the first North American leg to September 2020 due to COVID-19 pandemic. As the pandemic worsened, all 2020 dates had to be either postponed to 2021 (which were later cancelled), or ultimately cancelled, which included the second North American leg, the second European leg, and festival appearances, which ultimately made March 11, 2020, the official last date of the III: The World Tour.

Set list
This set list is from the concert on November 2, 2019 in Madrid. It is not intended to represent all shows from the tour.

"Sleep on the Floor"
"Cleopatra"
"Life in the City"
"Submarines"
"Dead Sea"
"Leader of the Landslide"
"Gun Song"
"Flowers in Your Hair"
"Ho Hey"
"Ophelia"
"Gloria"
"It Wasn’t Easy to Be Happy for You"
"Charlie Boy"
"My Cell"
"Jimmy Sparks"
"April"
"Salt and the Sea"
"Slow It Down"
"Big Parade"
Encore
"Donna"
"Angela"
"Gale Song"
"Stubborn Love"

Tour dates

Cancelled shows

Notes

References

2019 concert tours
2020 concert tours
The Lumineers
Concert tours postponed due to the COVID-19 pandemic